Kanuri is a dialect continuum spoken in Nigeria, Niger, Chad and Cameroon, as well as in small minorities in southern Libya and by a diaspora in Sudan.

Background
At the turn of the 21st century, its two main dialects, Manga Kanuri and Yerwa Kanuri (also called Beriberi, which its speakers consider to be pejorative), were spoken by 9,700,000 people in Central Africa. It belongs to the Western Saharan subphylum of Nilo-Saharan. Kanuri is the language associated with the Kanem and Bornu empires that dominated the Lake Chad region for a thousand years.

The basic word order of Kanuri sentences is subject–object–verb.

Kanuri has three tones: high, low, and falling.  It has an extensive system of consonantal lenition; for example,  'they' +  'have eaten' →  'they have eaten'.

Traditionally a local lingua franca, its usage has declined in recent decades. Most first-language speakers speak Hausa or Arabic as a second language.

Geographic distribution
Kanuri is spoken mainly in lowlands of the Chad Basin, with speakers in Cameroon, Chad, Niger, Nigeria, Sudan and Libya.

By country

Nigeria
The Kanuri region in Nigeria consists of Borno State and Yobe State. Some other states such as Jigawa, Gombe and Bauchi are also dominated by Kanuri people, but they are not included in this region. Cities and towns where Kanuri is spoken include Maiduguri, Damaturu, Hadejia, Akko, Duku, Kwami, Kano, Kaduna, Gusau, Jos and Lafia.

In central Nigeria, the Kanuri are usually referred to as Bare-Bari or Beriberi.

Central Kanuri, also known as Yerwa Kanuri, is the main language of the Kanuri people living in Borno State, Yobe State and Gombe State, and it is usually referred to as Kanuri in Nigeria.

Manga Kanuri, which is the main language of the Kanuri people in Yobe State, Jigawa State and Bauchi State, is usually referred to as Manga or Mangari or Mangawa, and they are distinct from the Kanuri, which is a term generally used for speakers of Central Kanuri.

The Kanembu language is also spoken in Borno State on the border with Chad.

Niger
In Niger, the Kanuri region is composed of Diffa Region and Zinder Region in the southeast. Parts of Agadez Region are also Kanuri. Cities where it is spoken include Zinder, Diffa, N'Guigmi and Bilma.

In Zinder region, the main dialect is Manga. In Diffa Region, the main dialect is Tumari or Kanembu; Kanembu is spoken by a minority. In Agadez Region, the main dialect is Bilma. Central Kanuri is minority dialect, and is commonly referred to as Bare-Bari or Beriberi.

Varieties
 Ethnologue divides Kanuri into the following languages, while many linguists (e.g. Cyffer 1998) regard them as dialects of a single language. The first three are spoken by ethnic Kanuri and thought by them as dialects of their language.

Central Kanuri
Manga Kanuri
Tumari Kanuri
Bilma Kanuri (or Bilms)
Kanembu

The variety attested in 17th-century Qur'anic glosses is known as Old Kanembu.  In the context of religious recitation and commentaries, a heavily archaizing descendant of this is still used, called Tarjumo.

Phonology

Consonants 

 There may also exist prenasalized voiced stop consonant sounds , although it is not known whether they are considered phonemic.
 A voiceless fricative  occurs as an allophone of  when preceding back vowels .
  occurs as an allophone of  when preceding velar stop consonants. Often, the stop sounds are deleted or misheard, so just the nasal sound  is mainly heard.

Vowels 

Written Kanuri
Kanuri has been written using the Ajami Arabic script, mainly in religious or court contexts, for at least four hundred years.  More recently, it is also sometimes written in a modified Latin script.  The Gospel of John published in 1965 was produced in Roman and Arabic script.

Alphabet
A standardized romanized orthography (known as the Standard Kanuri Orthography in Nigeria) was developed  by the Kanuri Research Unit and the Kanuri Language Board. Its elaboration, based on the dialect of Maiduguri, was carried out by the Orthography Committee of the Kanuri Language Board, under the Chairmanship of Abba Sadiq, Waziri of Borno. It was officially approved by the Kanuri Language Board in Maiduguri, Nigeria, in 1975.

Letters used :
a b c d e ǝ f g h i j k l m n ny o p r ɍ s sh t u w y z.

Sample text (Central Kanuri) 
Adamgana sammaso nəmkam-a daraja-a tilo. Sandiye nzundu-a nəmkam-a, nəmkam-a mbeji.

Translation

All human beings are born free and equal in dignity and rights. They are endowed with reason and conscience and should act towards one another in a spirit of brotherhood.

(Article 1 of the Universal Declaration of Human Rights)

See also
Kanuri word list (Wiktionary)

Sources
 Norbert Cyffer & John P. Hutchison  (eds.) Dictionary of the Kanuri Language (Publications in African languages and linguistics, 13). Foris Publications 1990. .
 Norbert Cyffer, We Learn Kanuri (book and 2 audio cassettes), Rüdiger Köppe Verlag: Köln 1993.
 Norbert Cyffer, English-Kanuri Dictionary, Rüdiger Köppe Verlag: Köln 1994.
 Norbert Cyffer, A Sketch of Kanuri. Rüdiger Köppe Verlag: Köln 1998.
Documentation for ISO 639 identifier: kau

References

Sources 

 Barth, Heinrich 1854. Schreiben an Prof. Lepsius uber die Beziehung der Kanori- und Teda-Sprachen. Zeitschrift für Erdkunde, 2: 372–74, 384–87.
 Bulakarima, S. Umara 1997. Survey of Kanuri dialects. in Advances in Kanuri Scholarship, ed. N. Cyffer and T. Geider. Pp. 67–75. Cologne: Rudiger Koppe.
 Chonai, Hassan 1998. Gruppa teda-kanuri (centraľnosaxarskaja sem’ja jazykov) i ee genetičeskie vzaimootnošenija (ėtimologičeskij i fonologičeskij aspekt). Moskva: PhD. Dissertation (Rossijskij gosudarstvennyj gumanitarnyj universitet).
 Hutchison, John P. 1981. The Kanuri Language. A Reference Grammar. Madison: University of Wisconsin.
 Koelle, Sigismund Wilhelm 1854. Grammar of the Bornu or Kanuri Language. London: Church Missionary Society.
 Lange, Dierk 1972. Un vocabulaire kanuri de la fin du XVIIe siècle.  Cahiers d'Études africaines, 12(46): 277–290.
 Lukas, Johannes 1937. A Study of the Kanuri Language. Grammar and Vocabulary. London: Oxford University Press.

External links
Kanuri Vocabulary List (from the World Loanword Database)
PanAfrican L10n page on Kanuri
Alphabet Kanuri
Dictionary of Manga Kanuri

Languages of Cameroon
Languages of Chad
Languages of Niger
Languages of Nigeria
Saharan languages
Lake Chad
Subject–object–verb languages